The president of Hunan University is the highest academic official of Hunan University. The president is the chief executive, appointed by the Ministry of Education of the People's Republic of China (MOE).

The university's current president is Zhao Yueyu, formerly Dean of the Graduate School of Hunan University.

Presidents of Hunan University

Communist Party secretaries of Hunan University

References

External links
 
  

 
Hunan University